The Chinese Society for Electrical Engineering (CSEE) is a professional organization for electrical engineers in China. It was founded in 1934 in Shanghai, as the Chinese Society for Electrical Engineers. , its members include over 120,000 individual engineers and over 1000 organizations.

The CSEE is a member of the China Association for Science and Technology (CAST).
It includes 32 provincial societies, 32 study committees on subtopics within electrical engineering, and 8 working committees. Together with the electrical engineering organizations of several other Asian countries, it is a sponsor of the annual International Conference of Electrical Engineering. Its flagship academic journal, founded in 1964 and produced in cooperation with CAST and the China Electric Power Research Institute, is the Proceedings of the Chinese Society for Electrical Engineering.

See also
List of engineering societies

References

External links

Scientific organizations established in 1934
Engineering societies based in China